Chris Spirou is a politician in New Hampshire in the United States. He was born in the town of Porti in the Prefecture of Karditsa, Province of Thessaly, Greece, and migrated in 1956, at the age of 13, to the United States of America. He attended Saint Anselm College, Goffstown, New Hampshire, and holds a master's degree in urban studies and social change from the short-lived Goddard-Cambridge Graduate Program in Social Change, the records of which are maintained by Goddard College, Vermont. Spirou has been a guest lecturer in many universities including Harvard University and Dartmouth College and taught a course as an adjunct professor at New Hampshire College (now Southern New Hampshire University). In 1970 he was elected to the New Hampshire House of Representatives. Spirou served as House Minority Leader from 1975 to 1984 and was the Democratic nominee for governor in 1984, but was defeated by incumbent John Sununu, Spirou later served as chair of the state Democratic Party, but returned to Greece in 1993.

In 1994, Spirou was elected president of the board of the Hellenic American Union (HAU), an Athens-based non-profit association founded in 1957 to promote U.S.-Greek educational and cultural ties, including through English teaching and testing. 
Income from HAU's testing program funded the creation of the Hellenic American University by an act of the New Hampshire state legislature in 2004, with Spirou as first president. He remained on the board of the University after stepping down as president in 2012.
While in Athens, Spirou established friendly ties with Slobodan Milošević, the president of Serbia, who invited him to be a member of the Serbian delegation to the Dayton peace talks in 1995. 
Other political initiatives included his foundation of the Pan Orthodox Congregation of Hagia Sophia, Inc., with the aim of reconverting Hagia Sophia in Istanbul into a working Orthodox church, and public opposition to the 2018 Prespa agreement between Greece and the renamed North Macedonia.

References

External links
http://hellasfrappe.blogspot.com/2012/10/chris-spirou-to-romney-stop-offending.html
https://web.archive.org/web/20121113014440/http://www.hellenicnews.com/index.php/omogenia-a-national-issues/itemlist/tag/chris%20spirou

Candidates in the 1984 United States elections
Democratic Party members of the New Hampshire House of Representatives
Greek emigrants to the United States
Saint Anselm College alumni
Goddard College alumni
1943 births
Living people
Southern New Hampshire University faculty
People from Mouzaki